TCMC may refer to:

 The Commonwealth Medical College, former name of Geisinger Commonwealth School of Medicine
 Tri-City Medical Center, a hospital in Oceanside, California
 TCMC, alternative abbreviation for the chemical DOTAM
 The Twin Cities-Milwaukee-Chicago project (TCMC), a planned train route
 Thomson Components - Mostek Corporation (onetime subsidiary of Thomson Semiconducteurs, the semiconductor arm of France’s Thomson-CSF